Anatatha is a genus of moths of the family Noctuidae.

Species
Anatatha lignea (Butler, 1879)
Anatatha lophonota (Hampson, 1898)
Anatatha maculifera (Butler, 1889)
Anatatha misae Sugi, 1982
Anatatha nigrisigna (Hampson, 1895)
Anatatha wilemani (Sugi, 1958)

References
Natural History Museum Lepidoptera genus database

Catocalinae
Noctuoidea genera